McDonald Creek Provincial Park is a provincial park in British Columbia, Canada, located 10 km south of Nakusp along Highway 6 in the Arrow Lakes region. The 468-hectare park is bisected by Upper Arrow Lake, and it provides beaches, a boat launch and 73 camping spaces on the eastern shore of the reservoir. Formerly a homesteading site, the area was set aside for recreation in 1982. In 2014, the campground underwent an upgrade, including the installation of a new services including showers and additional camping spaces.

References

External links
BC Parks webpage

Provincial parks of British Columbia
Regional District of Central Kootenay
Arrow Lakes